Karen Black was an American actress whose career spanned over 50 years, and included over 200 credits across film, television, and theater. She made her Broadway debut in 1965 before making her major film debut in Francis Ford Coppola's You're a Big Boy Now (1966). She subsequently appeared as an acid-tripping prostitute in Dennis Hopper's road film Easy Rider (1969), which she followed with a lead in the drama Five Easy Pieces (1970), for which she was nominated for an Academy Award and won a Golden Globe for Best Supporting Actress, and the disaster film Airport 1975 (1974). Her following role as Myrtle Wilson in Jack Clayton's The Great Gatsby (1974) won her a second Golden Globe for Best Supporting Actress.

Black starred as a glamorous country singer in Robert Altman's ensemble musical drama Nashville (1975), and as an aspiring actress in John Schlesinger's drama The Day of the Locust (1975), which earned her a third Golden Globe nomination. She subsequently appeared in three roles in Dan Curtis's anthology horror film Trilogy of Terror (1975), followed by Curtis's supernatural horror feature, Burnt Offerings (1976). The same year, she starred as a con artist in Alfred Hitchcock's final film, Family Plot.

In 1982, Black starred as a trans woman in Altman's drama Come Back to the Five and Dime, Jimmy Dean, Jimmy Dean, followed by a lead in Tobe Hooper's remake of Invaders from Mars (1986). She also appeared on television, guest-starring on such series as E/R (1984–1985), Murder, She Wrote (1987), and Miami Vice (1989). Throughout the 1990s, Black appeared in a wide variety of independent and experimental films, a trend she continued into the 2000s.
Her role as a murderous mother in Rob Zombie's House of 1000 Corpses (2003) helped cement her status as a cult horror icon. She continued to appear in low-profile films throughout the early 2010s before her death in 2013.

Film

Television

Stage

References

Sources

External links

Actress filmographies
American filmographies